Children of the Streets is a 1914 Swedish silent drama film directed by Victor Sjöström.

Cast
 Lili Bech as Jenny
 Emil Bergendorff
 Stina Berg as Guest
 Sven Bergvall as Young Journalist
 Gustaf Callmén
 John Ekman
 Gunnar Tolnæs as Karl Sterner
 Jenny Tschernichin-Larsson as Wife

References

External links

1914 films
1910s Swedish-language films
Swedish black-and-white films
1914 drama films
Swedish silent films
Films directed by Victor Sjöström
Swedish drama films
Silent drama films